
Gmina Kazimierza Wielka is an urban-rural gmina (administrative district) in Kazimierza County, Świętokrzyskie Voivodeship, in south-central Poland.

Villages
Apart from the town of Kazimierza Wielka, Gmina Kazimierza Wielka contains the villages and settlements of Boronice, Broniszów, Chruszczyna Mała, Chruszczyna Wielka, Cło, Cudzynowice, Dalechowice, Donatkowice, Donosy, Gabułtów, Głuchów, Góry Sieradzkie, Gorzków, Gunów-Kolonia, Gunów-Wilków, Hołdowiec, Jakuszowice, Kamieńczyce, Kamyszów, Kazimierza Mała, Krzyszkowice, Łękawa, Lekszyce, Łyczaków, Marcinkowice, Nagórzanki, Odonów, Paśmiechy, Plechów, Plechówka, Podolany, Sieradzice, Skorczów, Słonowice, Stradlice, Wielgus, Wojciechów, Wojsławice, Wymysłów, Zagórzyce, Zięblice and Zysławice.

Neighbouring gminas
Gmina Kazimierza Wielka is bordered by the gminas of Bejsce, Czarnocin, Koszyce, Opatowiec, Pałecznica, Proszowice and Skalbmierz.

References
Polish official population figures 2006

Kazimierza Wielka
Kazimierza County